The 1998 Big West Conference baseball tournament determined the conference champion for the Big West Conference at the end of the 1998 season. The six teams met at Cal State Fullerton's on campus venue, Titan Field from May 14 through 17. This would be the last Big West Conference postseason championship event, as the tournament was discontinued after the 1998 season. It has not been revived, as of the 2013 season.

Seeding and format 
The top team from each of the conference's two divisions after the regular season received the top two seeds, while the four teams with the highest conference winning percentage regardless of division were seeded three through six in the double-elimination tournament.

Bracket 
The bracket below depicts the results of the tournament.

Tournament notes 
 Nevada's 29 runs are a tournament record

References 

Tournament
Big West Conference Baseball Championship